George Jack may refer to:

 George Jack (architect) (1855–1931), British Arts and Crafts designer and architect
 George Jack (rugby union), Scottish former rugby union player
 George W. Jack (1875–1924), United States district judge